Sindhuli District, a part of the Bagmati Province, is one of the seventy-seven districts of Nepal, a landlocked country of South Asia. As per the 2011 census, Sindhuli District has a population of 296,192.

Etymology 

i) Before being annexed as an integral part of Nepal, it was under the governance of Makwani king. Raghab Narendra Sen, who was the King of Makwanpur in 1530 and known as the Sindhuli, established the settlement of the region and thus it was named after him.

ii) At ancient time the great saint used to dwell in the hill (1077 m above sea level) of nowadays Sindhuli madi. He was popular as Siddha Baba (one who got enlightened) among residents of Sindhuli district. This place got its naming under his name and began to be called as Siddhasthali सिद्धस्थाली (place where enlighten lives). With time it got deviated and began to be pronounced as Sindhuli.

iii) An indigenous group (Tamangs) were predominant in this region. These indigenous people call Singthuwa (सिङ्थुवा) for cutting down tree and Sinthuji (सिङ्थुजी) for collecting timber. Due to the presence of intense forest within this region, the herding of goats was popular and way of living was dependent on agriculture and forest resources. Over time due to gradual deviation in the naming this region got its name as Sindhuli.

iv) Hinduism began from this place called Sindhuli.

History 

This place has a huge historic significance. The Sindhuli Gadhi in Sindhuli is the place where British soldiers were defeated for the first time in Asia in 1767 A.D. The British under the leadership of Captain Kinloch came to help the then ruler of Kathmandu, Jai Prakash Malla against the attack of Prithvi Narayan Shah. The Gorkhali soldiers were familiar with the terrain and used it to their advantage. Despite being outmatched by the British Army's advanced weaponry such as guns and cannons, the Gurkhas fought bravely and ultimately defeated the British. The British retreated, leaving behind their weapons. In addition to being a historically significant place, it is known for its beautiful scenery and natural resources. However, in recent years, due to a lack of maintenance, it has become a place that mainly preserves the remnants of the past.

Demographics
At the time of the 2011 Nepal census, Sindhuli District had a population of 296,192. Of these, 48.1% spoke Nepali, 26.2% Tamang, 10.8% Magar, 5.8% Danuwar, 2.3% Newari, 1.6% Maithili, 1.6% Majhi, 1.6% Sunuwar,   0.5% Rai, 0.3% Vayu, 0.3% Wambule, 0.2% Thangmi, 0.1% Bhojpuri, 0.1% Gurung and 0.1% other languages as their first language.

In terms of ethnicity/caste, 27.0% were Tamang, 14.8% Magar, 13.6% Chhetri, 7.8% Hill Brahmin, 6.3% Newar, 5.9% Danuwar, 4.6% Kami, 3.6% Sarki, 3.5% Majhi, 3.1% Damai/Dholi, 2.7% Sunuwar, 1.5% Gharti/Bhujel, 1.0% Rai, 0.6% Hayu, 0.6% Musahar, 0.6% Thakuri, 0.5% Sanyasi/Dasnami, 0.3% Pahari, 0.3% Sudhi, 0.3% Thami, 0.2% Terai Brahmin, 0.2% Gurung, 0.1% Bhote, 0.1% Kalwar, 0.1% Sonar, 0.1% Teli and 0.2% others.

In terms of religion, 64.5% were Hindu, 30.4% Buddhist, 3.3% Prakriti, 1.0% Christian, 0.3% Kirati, 0.1% Muslim and 0.4% others.

In terms of literacy, 60.1% could read and write, 3.2% could only read and 36.6% could neither read nor write.

Administration
The district consists of 9 Municipalities, out of which two are urban municipalities and seven are rural municipalities. These are as follows:
Kamalamai Municipality
Dudhauli Municipality
Sunkoshi Rural Municipality
Hariharpur Gadhi Rural Municipality
Tinpatan Rural Municipality
Marin Rural Municipality
Golanjor Rural Municipality
Phikkal Rural Municipality
Ghyanglekh Rural Municipality

Former Village Development Committees 
Prior to the restructuring of the district, Sindhuli District consisted of the following municipalities and Village development committees:

 Amale
 Arun Thakur
 Bahuntilpung
 Balajor
 Basheshwor
 Bastipur
 Belghari
 Bhadrakali
 Bhiman
 Bhimeshwar
 Bhimsthan
 Bhuwaneshwar Gwaltar
 Bitijor Bagaincha
 Chure
 Dandiguranse
 Dudbhanjyang
 Hariharpur Gadhi
 Hatpate
 Harsahi
 Jalkanya
 Jarayotar
 Jhangajholi Ratmata
 Jinakhu
 Kakur Thakur
 Kalpabrishykha
 Kapilakot
 Khang Sang
 Kholagaun
 Kusheshwar Dumja
 Kyaneshwar
 Ladabhir
 Lampantar
 Mahadevdada
 Mahadevsthan
 Mahendrajhayadi
 Majhuwa
 Netrakali
 Nipane
 Purano Jhangajholi
 Ranibas
 Ranichauri
 Ratamata
 Ratnachura
 Ratnawati
 Shanteshwari
 Siddheshwari
 Sirthauli
 Sitalpati
 Solpathana
 Sumnam Pokhari
 Tamajor
 Tandi
 Tinkanya
 Tosramkhola
 Tribhuvan Ambote

Education
Sindhuli district especially Kamalamai Municipality has a good facility of education up to SEE levels. The quality of +2 levels too is fine here. Many private colleges run +2 commerce affiliated to NEB. However, the number of +2 science colleges are very few. Science college like Kamala Higher Secondary School is providing good practical based education to students of Sindhuli. This college has been serving as the central of excellence for all science students throughout Sindhuli valley. There are also colleges to teach technical educations. The technical subjects affiliated with CTEVT; mainly Civil Overseer i.e. Sub Engineer, too are taught here. The district offers higher education in technical fields like B.Sc.ag (AFU) and B.Tech. IT (KU)

Higher Education
There are many colleges which facilitate higher education. There are a large number of colleges running courses with affiliation to universities of Nepal. Colleges like Sindhuli Multiple Campus fall under this category. Kamala Science Campus enables students to acquire Bachelor of Science courses (BSc.).

Colleges
Kamala Science Campus
Sindhuli Multiple College
Siddha Jyoti Siksha College
Gaumati Multiple College
Bhim Jyoti Campus
Marin Multiple College
Saraswati Campus Dakaha
Lampantar multiple campus

Schools
 Lampantar English Boarding School, Chakmake Bazar, Sindhuli
 Sindhuli Academy
 New English Boarding School 
 Bhagawati Secondary English Boarding School
 Kamala Higher Secondary School
 Siddhasthali English Boarding Secondary School
 Shree Jana Jyoti Higher Secondary School
 Bainkateshwor Higher Secondary School
 Gaumati Higher Secondary School
 Barun Devi Higher Secondary School
 Shree Deurali Lower Secondary School
 Shree Bhabishya Nirmata Siddhabba Higher Secondary School
 Kalimati Nimna Secondary School
 Siddhababa English Boarding School
 Scholars Academy
 New Star Academy
 Suryodaya Secondary English Boarding School
 Janata Higher secondary English Boarding School
 Shree Sindhuli Gadhi Public English School
 Sindhuli Vidhyashram Public Educational Trust
 Swiss Sindhuli Secondary English Medium School
 Aadhunik English Boarding School
 Shree prabhat higher secondary school
 Shree Jana Jagriti HSS Bhiman
 Shining Moon Academy
 Shree Saraswati Secondary School Dakaha
 Kamala Academic School-Bhiman
 Shree Kundeshwor Higher Secondary School-Besare Besi
Shree Marin Academy Boarding School
shree secondary school kartike-kapilakot
Shree Kusheshwor Vidhya Peeth Secondary School Sunkoshi-1 Dumja Sindhuli
Ma.Vi.Lampantar Tinpatan 11 Lampiantar Sindhuli

Technical Colleges 
College of Natural Resource Management- Marin
Sindhuli Community Technical Institute (SCTI)
Janjyoti secondary school
 Saraswati Secondary School Dakaha

Geography and climate

References

External links 

 
 UN map of VDC boundaries, water features and roads in Sindhuli

 
Districts of Nepal established during Rana regime or before
Districts of Bagmati Province